The 2015 UEFA Regions' Cup was the ninth UEFA Regions' Cup.

Preliminary round 
The eight teams in the preliminary round have been drawn into two groups of four. Group A was played in Estonia, while Group B was played in Slovenia. Matches in the preliminary round were played between 23 and 27 July 2014 (Group A) and between 15 and 19 June 2014 (Group B). The two group winners advanced to the intermediary round.

Group A

Group B

Intermediary round 
The 30 teams which went straight through to the intermediary round were joined by the two group winners from the preliminary round. The 32 teams have been drawn into eight groups of four, with the following countries hosting each group's matches:

Group 1 – 
Group 2 – 
Group 3 – 
Group 4 – 
Group 5 – 
Group 6 – 
Group 7 – 
Group 8 – 

Matches in the intermediary round were played between 25 September 2014 and 24 October 2014. The winners of each group qualified for the final tournament.

Group 1

Group 2

Group 3

Group 4

Group 5

Group 6

Group 7

Group 8

Final tournament
The final tournament was held in the Republic of Ireland, with the final game scheduled for 4 July 2015.

The draw took place at Dublin Arena on 30 March.

Group A

Group B

Final

See also 
UEFA Regions' Cup

References

External links

2015 final tournament, UEFA.com
2015 final tournament programme, UEFA.com

2015
Regions